Sir Laurence Anthony Wallis New  (born 25 February 1932) is a former British Army officer who served as Assistant Chief of the General Staff and Assistant Chief of the Defence Staff in the mid-1980s.

Military career
Educated at King William's College located in Castletown on the Isle of Man and the Royal Military Academy Sandhurst, New was commissioned into the Royal Tank Regiment in 1952. He was appointed Brigade Major of 20th Armoured Brigade in 1968, Commanding Officer of 4th Royal Tank Regiment in 1971 and Defence and Military attaché in Tel Aviv in 1974. He then went on to be Brigadier General Staff (Intelligence) dealing with Northern Ireland intelligence in 1980, Chief of Staff at the Defence Intelligence Centre for the Falklands War in 1982 before becoming Assistant Chief of the General Staff in 1983. He went on to be Assistant Chief of the Defence Staff in 1984 before retiring in 1985. He was also Colonel Commandant of the Royal Tank Regiment from 1986 to 1993.

In retirement he became Lieutenant Governor of the Isle of Man as well as presiding officer of the Tynwald. He was also president of the Soldiers' and Airmen's Scripture Readers Association and international president of the Association of Military Christian Fellowships and has written a history of the 4th and 7th Royal Tank Regiments.

Family
In 1956 he married Anna Doreen Verity; they have two sons and two daughters.

References

|-

 

|-

1932 births
British Army generals
Knights Bachelor
Companions of the Order of the Bath
Commanders of the Order of the British Empire
People educated at King William's College
Royal Tank Regiment officers
Lieutenant Governors of the Isle of Man
Living people
Graduates of the Royal Military Academy Sandhurst
British military personnel of The Troubles (Northern Ireland)